Camacho is the seventh studio album by Australian rock musician Pete Murray. The album was released in June 2017 peaked at number 3 on the ARIA Charts. The album was supported with a 33-date national tour across Australia from July to September 2017.

Upon release, Murray said "With [Camacho] I feel like I've found a new sound – found my sound, because it's really getting away from what I've done before."

At the ARIA Music Awards of 2017, the album was nominated for ARIA Award for Best Adult Contemporary Album.

Critical reception

Josh Leeson from The Newcastle Herald gave the album 3 out of 5, stating: "While there are some cosmetic changes with loops and beats, Murray has stuck to his inoffensive brand of folk-rock. The title-track's melody is so closely inspired by the Animals' classic 'House of the Rising Sun' it could be considered a tribute, while "Take Me Down" has an infectious gospel-style chorus and ranks among his best work. Camacho isn't going to propel Murray back to his halcyon days of the mid-2000s, but rusted on fans will enjoy the familiar embrace."

Track listing

Charts

Weekly charts

Year-end charts

References

2017 albums
Pete Murray (Australian singer-songwriter) albums